Marije Vogelzang is a Dutch "food", or "eating", designer who focuses on how people design their food habits, ways and rituals. She regularly works as a designer for organizations and a food industry consultant. She became the head of the food department at the Design Academy Eindhoven in 2014. Her 2017 "Volumes" project, focused on the design of eating devices which help eaters think their plates are fuller than they are, to reduce overeating.

References

External links 
 

Dutch designers
Academic staff of Design Academy Eindhoven
Eating behaviors of humans
Living people
Year of birth missing (living people)